The Oettingen-Rennen is a Group 2 flat horse race in Germany open to thoroughbreds aged three years or older. It is run at Baden-Baden over a distance of 1,600 metres (about 1 mile), and it is scheduled to take place each year in late August or early September.

History
The event was established in 1927, and it was originally known as the Badener Meile. It was renamed the Oettingen-Rennen in 1970, and for a period it held Group 3 status. A different race called the Badener Meile was created in 1979.

Darley Stud started to sponsor the Oettingen-Rennen in 1999. The race was promoted to Group 2 level in 2003.

Records
Most successful horse (2 wins):
 Enak – 1933, 1934
 Campanile – 1960, 1961
 Novalis – 1964, 1965
 Pas de Deux – 2016, 2017

Leading jockey (4 wins):
 Kurt Narr – Teutone (1928), Enak (1933, 1934), Kameradschaftler (1938)
 Peter Remmert – Campanile (1961), Oberbootsmann (1966), Bussard (1968), Aspros (1981)
 Terence Hellier – Zabar (1993), Waky Nao (1997), Bernardon (2000), Martillo (2005)

Leading trainer (4 wins):
 Albert Schlaefke – Enak (1933, 1934), Wacholdis (1951), Der Unhold (1954)

Winners since 1972

Earlier winners

 1927: Palü
 1928: Teutone
 1929: Oberwinter
 1930: Dianthus
 1931: Laotse
 1932: Orkadier
 1933: Enak
 1934: Enak
 1935: Andante
 1936: Wiener Walzer
 1937: Fidelitas
 1938: Kameradschaftler
 1939: Reichsfürst
 1940: no race
 1941: Meertaucher
 1942: Flying Call
 1943: Figaro
 1944: Pionier
 1945–47: no race
 1948: Salvator
 1949–50: no race
 1951: Wacholdis
 1952: Maud
 1953: Don Juan
 1954: Der Unhold
 1955: Zobel
 1956: Lauffeuer
 1957: Prinz Aga
 1958: Magliaso
 1959: Nettuno
 1960: Campanile
 1961: Campanile
 1962: Oceana
 1963: Parabola
 1964: Novalis
 1965: Novalis
 1966: Oberbootsmann
 1967: Pasteur
 1968: Bussard
 1969: Avance
 1970: Fred Babu
 1971: Rocket

See also
 List of German flat horse races

References
 Racing Post / siegerlisten.com:
 1983, 1984, 1985, 1986, 1987, 
 galopp-sieger.de – Oettingen-Rennen (vormals Badener Meile).
 horseracingintfed.com – International Federation of Horseracing Authorities – Oettingen-Rennen (2014).
 pedigreequery.com – Oettingen-Rennen – Baden-Baden.

Open mile category horse races
Horse races in Germany
Recurring sporting events established in 1927
Sport in Baden-Württemberg